Trey or Tre Smith may refer to:

 Trey Smith (DJ) (born 1992), son of actor Will Smith
 Trey Smith (offensive lineman) (born 1999), American football offensive lineman
 Tre Smith (running back) (born 1984), American football running back
 Trevor Smith (actor) (born 1970), Canadian television personality known as Tre Smith

See also
 Torrey Smith (born 1989), American football wide receiver
 Troy Smith (disambiguation)